The 2010–11 San Francisco Dons men's basketball team represented the University of San Francisco in the 2010–11 NCAA Division I men's basketball season. The Dons, led by head coach Rex Walters, played their home games at War Memorial Gymnasium in San Francisco, California, as members of the West Coast Conference. The Dons finished 3rd in the West Coast Conference during the regular season, and were eliminated in the semifinals of the WCC tournament by Gonzaga.

San Francisco failed to qualify for the NCAA tournament, but were invited to the 2011 CIT. The Dons won their first two games of the CIT to advance to the quarterfinals, where they were eliminated by WCC rival and eventual tournament champions Santa Clara, 95–91.

Roster 

Source

Schedule and results

|-
!colspan=9 style=|Exhibition

|-
!colspan=9 style=|Regular season

|-
!colspan=9 style=| WCC tournament

|-
!colspan=9 style=| CollegeInsider.com tournament

Source

References

San Francisco Dons men's basketball seasons
San Francisco
San Francisco
San Francisco men's basketball
San Francisco men's basketball